This is a list of interstellar radio messages (IRMs) transmitted from Earth.

Classification of interstellar radio messages 
There are twelve realized IRM projects:

 The Morse Message (1962)
 Arecibo message (1974), one transmission to Messier 13
 Cosmic Call 1 (1999), four transmissions to nearby Sun-like stars
 Teen Age Message (2001), six transmissions
 Cosmic Call 2 (2003), five transmissions
 A Message From Earth (2008), one transmission to the Gliese 581 planetary system
 Across the Universe (2008)
 Hello From Earth (HFE, 2009) one transmission to the Gliese 581 planetary system
 Wow! Reply (2012), three transmissions to Hipparcos 34511, Hipparcos 33277 and Hipparcos 43587 in reply to the Wow! signal
 Lone Signal (2013)
 A Simple Response to an Elemental Message (2016)
 Sónar Calling GJ273b (2017)

"Across the Universe", "Hello From Earth" and "A Simple Response to an Elemental Message" are not always considered serious. The first two of them were sent to Polaris, which is 431 light years distant from us and whose planetary system, even if it exists, may not be suited for life, because it is a supergiant star, spectral type F7Ib which is only 70 million years old. In addition, both transmission rates were very high, about 128 kbit/s, for such moderate transmitter power (about 18 kW). The main defect of the "Hello From Earth" is an insufficient scientific and technical justification, since no famous SETI scientist made statements with validation of HFE's design. As it follows from : "After the final message was collected on Monday 24 August 2009, messages were exported as a text file and sent to NASA's Jet Propulsion Laboratory in California, where they were encoded into binary, packaged and tested before transmission", but nobody explained why he hopes that such encoded and packaged text will be understood and conceived by possible extraterrestrials.

Some use the term Active SETI Project, but Alexander Zaitsev, who was a scientific head of composing and transmissions of Cosmic Call 1999 & 2003, and Teen Age Message 2001, and a scientific consultant of A Message From Earth, emphasized that he considers above IRMs as the METI (Messaging to Extra-Terrestrial Intelligence Projects).

These seven messages have targeted stars between 20 and 69 light-years from the Earth. The exception is the Arecibo message, which targeted globular cluster M13, approximately 24,000 light-years away. The first message to reach its destination will be A Message From Earth, which should reach the Gliese 581 planetary system in Libra in 2029.

On 13 February 2015, scientists (including Geoffrey Marcy, Seth Shostak, Frank Drake, David Grinspoon and David Brin) at a convention of the American Association for the Advancement of Science, discussed Active SETI and whether transmitting a message to possible intelligent extraterrestrials in the Cosmos was a good idea; one result was a statement, (which was not signed by Seth Shostak or Frank Drake), that a "worldwide scientific, political and humanitarian discussion must occur before any message is sent".

Current transmissions en route
Stars to which messages were sent include:

Along with serious IRM projects, a bulk of pseudo-METI projects also exist:
 
 Poetica Vaginal (1986)
 Discovery Channel Message (2005)
 Craigslist Messages (2005), (2005)
 CNES Cosmic Connexion (2006)
 Doritos Advert (2008)
 RuBisCo Message (2009)
 Sent Forever, 
 Penguin UK

References

External links
 Classification of interstellar radio messages
 Who Speaks for Earth?
 Earth calling: A short history of radio messages to ET
 Interstellar Radio Messages
 SETI: Terminating the transmission
 Self-Decoding Messages
 Breakthrough Message

Search for extraterrestrial intelligence
 
Time capsules
Technology in society